This is a list of the extreme points of Spain — the points that are farther north, south, east or west than any other location.

Spain
 Northernmost Point — Punta de Estaca de Bares, Mañón, Corunna at 
 Southernmost Point — Punta de La Restinga, El Pinar del Hierro, Santa Cruz de Tenerife at 
 Westernmost Point — Punta de la Orchilla, Frontera, Santa Cruz de Tenerife at 
 Easternmost Point — La Mola Island, Mahón, Balearic Islands at 
 Highest Point — El Teide 3,718 m, Tenerife, Santa Cruz de Tenerife
 Point furthest from the coast (Iberian Pole of Inaccessibility) at Otero, Toledo

Spanish mainland
 Northernmost Point — Punta de Estaca de Bares, Corunna at 
 Southernmost Point — Punta de Tarifa, Cádiz at 
 Westernmost Point — Cape Touriñán, Corunna at 
 Easternmost Point — Cap de Creus, Gerona at 
 Centre of the Península is reputedly assigned to Cerro de los Ángeles in Getafe (16 km south of Madrid) at 
 Highest Point — Mulhacen 3,478 m, Sierra Nevada, Granada

Provincial capitals 
 Northernmost: Santander at 
 Southernmost: Las Palmas de Gran Canaria at 
 Westernmost: Santa Cruz de Tenerife at 
 Easternmost: Gerona at  
 Highest: Ávila - 1,132 m (3,714 ft) at

See also 
 Geography of Spain
 Extreme points of Earth

References 

 
Spain
Extreme

ko:스페인의 지리#극점